Guido Erhard (6 October 1969 – 21 February 2002) was a German professional footballer who played as a forward.

References

External links
 

1969 births
2002 deaths
German footballers
Association football forwards
Bundesliga players
2. Bundesliga players
Kickers Offenbach players
TSV 1860 Munich players
VfL Wolfsburg players
1. FSV Mainz 05 players